The Holy Warrior may refer to:
The Holy Warrior - an episode of Paranoia Agent
Holy Warrior - a novel by Angus Donald
Hizbul Mujahideen or "party of holy warriors" - a Kashmiri militant group